Lush 3 is a single from British electronic band Orbital. It was released in August 1993.

The main two tracks Lush 3-1 and Lush 3-2 feature on Orbital's 1993 Brown Album, plus there are remixes from Underworld, Psychick Warriors ov Gaia and CJ Bolland.

Track listing

 1. "Lush 3-1" (5:39)
 2. "Lush 3-2" (4:41)
 3. "Lush 3-3 Underworld" (12:38)
 4. "Lush 3-4 Warrior Drift Psychick Warriors Ov Gaia" (10:48)
 5. "Lush 3-5 CJ Bolland" (6:14)

"Lush 3-1" and "Lush 3-2" play as a continuous piece, though they have separate indices.

Artwork

The sleeve was designed by Grant Fultano (Fultano 93) with photography by Sally Harding. The cover shows a close up of green grass, which can possibly be described as lush.

Charts

References

External links
 Lush 3 at Discogs.com

1993 songs
Orbital (band) songs